Southern Illinois Speech and Acting League (SISAL), formerly known as Egyptian Forensics League till 2015, is a forensics league of Southern Illinois. It comprises sixteen schools competing in various events.

Events
 Dramatic Duet Acting (DDA)
 Dramatic Interpretation (DI)
 Extemporaneous Speaking (EXTEMP)
 Humorous Duet Acting (HDA)
 Humorous Interpretation (HI)
 Impromptu Speaking (IMPT)
 Informative Speaking (INFO)
 Oratorical Declamation (DEC)
 Original Comedy (OC)
 Original Oratory (OO)
 Poetry Reading (PT)
 Prose Reading (PR)
 Radio Speaking (RADIO)
 Special Occasion Speaking (SOS)

Competing Schools
 Belleville East
 Belleville West
 Benton Consolidated High School (BCHS)
 Carbondale
 Carrier Mills
 Chatham
 DuQuoin
 East St. Louis
 Harrisburg
 Herrin
 Johnston City
 Marion
 Mt. Vernon
 O'Fallon
 Springfield High School (Illinois)
 Waterloo

External links
 SpeechWire

Student debating societies
https://www.ihsa.org/documents/ie/2021-22/t-and-cs.pdf